Delia Razon (born Lucy May Grytz; born August 8, 1931) is a Filipina actress born to a German father and a Spanish Filipina mother. She made her debut in 1949 in the LVN Pictures' Krus na Bituin. Dona Narcisa de Leon discovered Lucy's talent and gave her the screen name Delia Razon. She became popular for her loveteam with Rogelio dela Rosa. She married Aurelio Reyes, whose daughter Rea Reyes married Rey "PJ" Abellana, a 1980s movie heartthrob. Carla Abellana is Razon's granddaughter.

Filmography

Film
Awit ng Bulag (1948)
Gitano (1949)
Mutya ng Pasig (1950)
Prinsipe Amante sa Rubitanya (1951)
Rodrigo de Villa (1952)
Digmaan ng Damdamin (1952)
Señorito (1953)
Dambanang Putik (1954)
Lapu-Lapu (1955)
Luksang Tagumpay (1956)
Gaano Kadalas ang Minsan? (1982) 
Haplos (1982) 
Sigaw ng Katarungan (1984)
Kailan Sasabihing Mahal Kita (1985) - Meding Ortiz 
Ibigay Mo sa Akin ang Bukas (1987)
Kapag Puno Na ang Salop (1987)
Ang Supremo (1988)
Pik Pak Boom (1988)
Joey Boy Munti, 15 Anyos Ka sa Muntinlupa (1991)
Ipagpatawad Mo (1991)
Contreras Gang (1991) - Ricky's mother 
Patapon (1993) 
Galvez: Hanggang sa Dulo ng Mundo Hahanapin Kita (1993)
I Do? I Die! (D'yos Ko Day!) (1997)
Ika-13 Kapitulo (2000)
Buenavista (Ang Kasaysayan ng Lucena) (2010)

Television
Tayong Dalawa (2009) 
Biglang Sibol, Bayang Impasibol (2001)
''Agila (1987)

References

External links

1931 births
Living people
20th-century Filipino actresses
ABS-CBN personalities
Filipino film actresses
Filipino people of American descent
Filipino people of German descent
Visayan people